Leaf fish or Leaffish may refer to:
 Nandidae, African and Asian leaffishes
 Polycentridae, South American leaffishes
 Pristolepididae, Asian leaffishes
 Taenianotus triacanthus, the "leaf scorpionfish", a species of marine fish of the family Scorpaenidae